Red Barrels Inc. is a Canadian video game developer based in Montreal. The company was founded by Philippe Morin, David Chateauneuf and Hugo Dallaire in 2011. The three were previously developers for Ubisoft Montreal and EA Montreal, but founded the company after the origination of an original intellectual property by Dallaire in 2010. After leaving their respective workplaces, the team's online presence began in July 2012 and a trailer for the game that became Outlast.

History 
Philippe Morin, David Chateauneuf and Hugo Dallaire were originally video game developers for Ubisoft Montreal and were hired in 1997–1998, with Chateauneuf working on Tom Clancy's Splinter Cell, and Morin and Dallaire developing Prince of Persia: The Sands of Time. Morin left Ubisoft Montreal in 2009 and worked for EA Montreal in 2010 for an original intellectual property concept by Dallaire, but was cancelled within the same year. With no other options, Morin left in January 2011 to pursue Red Barrels. Chateauneuf remained a part of Ubisoft Montreal and was involved with level design work for the first Assassin's Creed game.

After resigning, Morin met Chateauneuf and Dallaire after the trio left their jobs, agreeing to start their own company.

In October 2012, the company announced Outlast, which was released in September 2013. The following October, Morin announced that a sequel, Outlast 2, was in development. Outlast 2 was released in April 2017. In July that year, the company released the first issue of comic mini-series The Murkoff Account, which was set for five comics detailing the narrative gap between Outlast and Outlast 2. On December 4, 2019, the company announced a multiplayer game, The Outlast Trials and released a teaser image.

Games developed

References

External links 
 

 
2011 establishments in Quebec
Canadian companies established in 2011
Companies based in Montreal
Indie video game developers
Video game companies established in 2011
Video game companies of Canada
Video game development companies
Video game publishers